Death and the Flower is an album recorded by Keith Jarrett in October 1974 during two sessions that also produced Back Hand. Released in 1975, the disc features the pianist's "American Quartet" (Dewey Redman, Charlie Haden, Paul Motian) with percussionist Guilherme Franco.

Reception

The Allmusic review by Scott Yanow awarded the album 3 stars stating, "The main selection, the 21-minute "Death and the Flower," develops logically from atmospheric sounds to intense group improvising and back again; it is the main reason to acquire this [recording].".

Writing for the now defunct jazz magazine Jazz.com, in 2008 Ted Gioia gave the title track "Death and the Flower" a 97/100 rating and praised it:

Pianist Bruce Hornsby recorded "Death and the Flower" with bassist Christian McBride and drummer Jack DeJohnette on Camp Meeting (Legacy Recordings, 2007).

Bassist Eric Revis, who has played with Betty Carter, Branford Marsalis, Orrin Evans, Steve Coleman, J. D. Allen and Avishai Cohen, recorded "Prayer" with pianist Kris Davis and drummer Andrew Cyrille on City of Asylum (Clean Feed, 2013).

Track listing
All compositions by Keith Jarrett
 "Death and the Flower" - 22:49
 "Prayer" - 10:12
 "Great Bird" - 8:45

Original notes 
On the album's inner sleeves Keith Jarrett signed this poem dated on December 5, 1974:

Personnel
Keith Jarrett - piano, wooden flute, soprano saxophone
Dewey Redman - tenor saxophone, musette, percussion
Charlie Haden - bass
Paul Motian - drums, percussion
Guilherme Franco - percussion

References 

Keith Jarrett albums
Impulse! Records albums
1975 albums